"This Night Won't Last Forever" is a song written by Bill LaBounty and Roy Freeland, and originally recorded by LaBounty in 1978, whose version of the song was a minor Adult Contemporary and pop hit, reaching number 65 on the Billboard Hot 100.

Michael Johnson version

The following year, American singer-songwriter Michael Johnson covered "This Night Won't Last Forever", released as the lead single from his fifth album Dialogue, backed with a cover of Parker McGee's "I Just Can't Say No to You", also included on the album. Johnson's version of "This Night Won't Last Forever" reached number 19 on the US Billboard Hot 100, and was also a top 10 Adult Contemporary hit in the United States (#5) and Canada (#9).

Bob Dylan version
In the early 1980s, Bob Dylan recorded a cover version of the song, which was issued on his 2021 compilation album The Bootleg Series Vol. 16: Springtime in New York 1980–1985.

Moe Bandy version
In 1988, Moe Bandy covered the song on his album Many Mansions. His version peaked at number 49 on the U.S. Hot Country charts in 1989.

Sawyer Brown version

In 1997, Sawyer Brown covered the song. It was released in June 1997 as the second single from the album Six Days on the Road. Sawyer Brown's version went to number 6 on the U.S. Hot Country Songs charts.

Critical reception
Larry Flick of Billboard reviewed Sawyer Brown's version and wrote, "It's a song that most people will remember and find themselves singing along with. The familiarity and strong performance should make for a potent combination at country radio."

Chart performance

Weekly charts

Bill LaBounty

Michael Johnson

Moe Bandy

Sawyer Brown

Year-end charts

References

1978 songs
1978 singles
1979 singles
1989 singles
1997 singles
Sawyer Brown songs
Moe Bandy songs
Michael Johnson (singer) songs
Bill LaBounty songs
Songs written by Bill LaBounty
Music videos directed by Michael Salomon
Curb Records singles
Warner Records singles
EMI America Records singles